Cosmeşti may refer to several places in Romania:

 Cosmești, Galați, a commune in Galați County
 Cosmești, Teleorman, a commune in Teleorman County